Sir Nicholas Williams, 1st Baronet (1681 – 19 July 1745) was a British politician.

He was the eldest son of Sir Rice Williams, of Edwinsford, Carmarthenshire, by his second wife, Mary Vaughan, daughter and co-heir of John Vaughan of Llanelly. He was educated at Eton College and Queens' College, Cambridge.

He was High Sheriff of Carmarthenshire from 1697 to 1698, and was created a baronet on 30 July 1707. From 1724 until his death, he was a Member of Parliament for Carmarthenshire in the Parliament of Great Britain, and was Lord Lieutenant of the county from 1735 to 1740. He was a supporter of Robert Walpole.

He married Mary Cocks, the daughter of Charles Cocks and niece of John Somers, 1st Baron Somers, on 19 June 1712 at St Mildred, Poultry, London. They had no children, and the baronetcy
became extinct on his death in 1745. His estate eventually devolved to the second and third Hamlyn-Williams baronets.

After his death, his brother Thomas took over as Custos Rotulorum of Carmarthenshire.

Armorials
The arms of Williams of Edwinsford are: Argent, a lion rampant sable, face, paws & tuft of the tail of the field.

References

1681 births
1745 deaths
People educated at Eton College
Baronets in the Baronetage of Great Britain
British MPs 1722–1727
British MPs 1727–1734
British MPs 1734–1741
British MPs 1741–1747
High Sheriffs of Carmarthenshire
Lord-Lieutenants of Carmarthenshire
Members of the Parliament of Great Britain for Welsh constituencies
Members of the Inner Temple
Alumni of Queens' College, Cambridge